Tuggeranong Parish is a parish of Murray County, New South Wales, a cadastral unit for use on land titles. It is now about a third of the size it was in the nineteenth century, after most of the land in the parish was transferred to the Australian Capital Territory in 1911. It currently includes a small section of land in New South Wales between the ACT border (Queanbeyan-Cooma railway line) and Jerrabomberra Creek, but once included most of what is now the Canberra town centre of Tuggeranong.

Former boundaries 

Before 1911, its border to the west was the Murrumbidgee River and its border to the east Jerrabomberra Creek. The southern boundary was in what is today the suburb of Gordon, near Tuggeranong Hill. The northern boundary was just north of Wanniassa and south of Mount Taylor.

References
Map showing proposed Federal Capital Territory and tenures of land within same, Charles Robt. Scrivener, 22 May 1909

Parishes of Canberra
Parishes of Murray County